Peng Shuai was the defending champion, but chose not to participate.

Ana Bogdan won the title, defeating Daria Snigur in the final, 6–1, 6–2.

Seeds

Draw

Finals

Top half

Bottom half

References

Main Draw

Al Habtoor Tennis Challenge - Singles
Al Habtoor Tennis Challenge
2019 in Emirati tennis